Jovan Haye (born June 21, 1982) is the defensive ends coach for the Vanderbilt Commodores. A former American football defensive lineman, Haye was drafted by the Carolina Panthers in the sixth round of the 2005 NFL Draft. He played college football at Vanderbilt.

Haye also played for the Cleveland Browns, Tampa Bay Buccaneers, Tennessee Titans and Detroit Lions.

Early years
Haye attended high school at Dillard High School in Fort Lauderdale, FL. He did not start playing football until his junior year, but still earned first-team All-State honors at offensive guard as a junior and senior. Aside from his athletic achievements, he also performed well academically, graduating with a 4.5 grade point average.

College career
Jovan Haye played college football at Vanderbilt. During his career he started 34 of 35 games and recorded 149 tackles, 10.5 sacks, and one interception. After his junior season, Haye entered the NFL Draft.

Professional career

Carolina Panthers
Haye was drafted by the Carolina Panthers in the sixth round of the 2005 NFL Draft. He only played two games for the Panthers and was cut on September 2, 2006.

Cleveland Browns
Haye was signed by the Cleveland Browns on September 3, 2006. On September 12, 2006, he was released, but was signed to Browns practice squad on September 14, 2006.

Tampa Bay Buccaneers
Haye was signed by the Tampa Bay Buccaneers on October 25, 2006. In his first season with the Bucs he played in nine games and recorded 17 tackles. In 2007, he became a full-time starter for the Bucs, starting all 16 games. He finished the season with 68 tackles and six sacks. In 2008, he started 14 of 15 games, recording 33 tackles and no sacks.

Tennessee Titans
On March 2, 2009, Haye agreed to a four-year, $16 million contract with the Tennessee Titans. He was waived on August 29, 2011.

Detroit Lions
On December 9, 2011 Haye signed with the Detroit Lions. Four days later, On December 13, 2011 he was released by the Detroit Lions.

Second stint with Tampa Bay Buccaneers
Haye re-signed with the Buccaneers on December 19, 2011.

Coaching career
In 2018, Haye was hired by his alma mater, Vanderbilt, to serve as a Defensive Quality Control coach. The following season, he was promoted to coaching the team's defensive line. In 2021 he was retained by Clark Lea and moved to coach the defensive ends.

References

External links
Tampa Bay Buccaneers bio
Tennessee Titans bio

1982 births
Living people
Jamaican players of American football
American football defensive tackles
Vanderbilt Commodores football players
Carolina Panthers players
Cleveland Browns players
Tampa Bay Buccaneers players
Tennessee Titans players
Detroit Lions players
Jamaican emigrants to the United States
Players of American football from Florida
Sportspeople from Broward County, Florida
Vanderbilt Commodores football coaches
People from Mandeville, Jamaica